The Great House in Laugharne, Carmarthenshire, Wales, is a Grade II*–listed early eighteenth century gentry residence in the Queen Anne style and is one of many buildings of note in the medieval township. The property was originally built with a central 'dog-leg' passage to the Double Pile plan with gable chimneys under two saddle roofs. Its interesting features include two carved round arches to the landing at first floor level, a small inset square-headed window to the central gable and an exceptional Baroque doorcase. The history of the house and that of its surroundings up to 1878 was chronicled by Mary Curtis.

References 

Houses in Carmarthenshire
Grade II* listed buildings in Carmarthenshire
Georgian architecture in Wales
Laugharne